The Morrisonville Times is a weekly newspaper in Morrisonville,  Christian County, Illinois, United States. The newspaper was started in 1875 by Thomas Cox. From August 1978 to 1996 the paper was owned and published by John Lennon of Springfield, IL, until the time of his passing. The newspaper converted to its current weekly format in 1996. For a five-year period, it was owned by Phillips Printing & Publishing with the corporate office located in Pana, Illinois at the Pana News-Palladium in Pana.

Beginning in February 2017, the Times was published as part of the Nokomis Free-Press Progress, until news coverage was handed off to the Panhandle Press in February 2018, following Pana News Inc.'s sale to Paddock Publications and under the management of Southern Illinois Local Media Group. 

Since February 2018, the newspaper has discontinued publication as a standalone newspaper, as coverage has been combined with the Panhandle Press. The Panhandle Press, published by Southern Illinois Local Media Group's subsidiary Gold Nugget Publications, is the publisher of four community papers in their cluster. The subsidiary facility, located in Virden, Illinois also publishes six other community newspapers for sister subsidiary Pana News Group, as well as several dozen newspapers in Southern Illinois.

The newspaper doesn't have a website presence, but it maintains a Facebook page.

References

Weekly newspapers published in the United States
Newspapers published in Illinois